Bezirk Neunkirchen is a district of the state of Lower Austria in Austria. It is located at the south of the state.

Municipalities
Altendorf
Parts of the village: Altendorf, Loitzmannsdorf, Schönstadl, Syhrn, Tachenberg
Aspang-Markt
Aspangberg-Sankt Peter
Parts of the village: Großes Amt, Kleines Amt, Neustift am Alpenwald, Neuwald
Breitenau
Breitenstein
Buchbach
Bürg-Vöstenhof
Parts of the village: Bürg, Vöstenhof
Edlitz
Enzenreith
Parts of the village: Enzenreith, Hart, Hilzmannsdorf, Köttlach, Thürmannsdorf, Wörth
Feistritz am Wechsel
Parts of the village: Feistritz am Wechsel, Grottendorf, Hasleiten, Hollabrunn
Gloggnitz
Parts of the town: Abfaltersbach, Aue, Berglach, Eichberg, Gloggnitz (with Furth and Gföhl), Graben, Heufeld, Saloder, Stuppach, Weißenbach
Grafenbach-Sankt Valentin
Parts of the village: Göttschach, Grafenbach, Ober-Danegg, Penk, St. Valentin-Landschach
Grimmenstein
Parts of the village: Grimmenstein, Hochegg
Grünbach am Schneeberg
Parts of the village: Grünbach am Schneeberg, Neusiedl am Walde
Höflein an der Hohen Wand
Parts of the village: Oberhöflein, Unterhöflein, Zweiersdorf
Kirchberg am Wechsel
Parts of the village: Alpeltal, Kirchberg (with Au, Markt, Molz, Rammergraben, Sachsenbrunn, Sellhof, Stein, Tratten, Weyer, Wieden Wiese), Kranichberg (with Baumtal, Eselberg, Friederdorf, Kiengraben, Oberer Kirchbgraben, Kreith, Kreithberg, Pucha, Pyhra, Rams), Lehen (Ortsteile Nebelsbach, Steinbach), Molzegg (with Kampsteiner Schwaig, Kreuzbauern, Molz, Steyersberger Schwaig), Ofenbach (with Eigenberg, Wieden)
Mönichkirchen
Parts of the village: Am Hartberg, Feldbauern, Mönichkirchner Schwaig, Pfeffergraben, Tauchen, Unterhöfen
Natschbach-Loipersbach
Parts of the village: Natschbach, Loipersbach (with Lindgrub)
Neunkirchen
Parts of the town: Neunkirchen (with Innere Stadt, Tal, Steinplatte, Mühlfeld, Au, Steinfeld, Lerchenfeld, Blätterstraßensiedlung), Mollram, Peisching
Otterthal
Payerbach
Parts of the village: Geyerhof, Kreuzberg, Küb, Mühlhof, Payerbach, Pettenbach, Schmidsdorf, Schlöglmühl, Werning
Pitten
Parts of the village: Pitten, Sautern, Leiding-Inzenhof
Prigglitz
Parts of the village: Gasteil, Prigglitz, Stuppachgraben
Puchberg am Schneeberg
Parts of the village: Knipflitz, Losenheim, Puchberg, Rohrbachgraben, Schneebergdörfl, Sonnenleiten, Stolzenwörth 
Raach am Hochgebirge
Parts of the village: Egg, Raach am Hochgebirge, Schlagl, Sonnleiten, Wartenstein
Reichenau an der Rax
Parts of the village: Edlach, Grünsting, Hirschwang, Klein- und Großau, Prein, Reichenau 
Scheiblingkirchen-Thernberg
Parts of the village: Gleißenfeld, Reitersberg, Scheiblingkirchen, Thernberg, Witzelsberg
Schottwien
Parts of the village: Göstritz, Greis, Schottwien
Schrattenbach
Parts of the village: Greith, Gutenmann, Hornungstal, Rosental, Schrattenbach
Schwarzau am Steinfeld
Parts of the village: Guntrams, Schwarzau am Steinfeld
Schwarzau im Gebirge
Parts of the village: Gegend, Naßwald, Preintal, Vois
Seebenstein
Parts of the village: Schiltern, Seebenstein, Sollgraben
Semmering
Sankt Corona am Wechsel
Sankt Egyden am Steinfeld
Parts of the village: Gerasdorf am Steinfeld, Neusiedl am Steinfeld, Saubersdorf, St. Egyden am Steinfeld, Urschendorf
Ternitz
Parts of the village: Dunkelstein, Flatz, Mahrersdorf, Pottschach, Putzmannsdorf, Raglitz, Rohrbach am Steinfelde, St. Johann am Steinfelde, Sieding, 
Thomasberg
Parts of the village: Königsberg, Kulma, Sauerbichl, Thomasberg
Trattenbach
Warth
Parts of the village: Haßbach, Kirchau, Kulm, Petersbaumgarten, Steyersberg, Thann, Warth
Wartmannstetten
Parts of the village: Diepolz, Hafning, Ramplach, Straßhof (mit den Ortsteilen Straßhof, Gramatl, Weibnitz), Unter-Danegg und Wartmannstetten
Willendorf
Parts of the village: Dörfles, Rothengrub, Strelzhof, Willendorf
Wimpassing im Schwarzatale
Würflach
Parts of the village: Hettmannsdorf, Wolfsohl, Würflach
Zöbern
Parts of the village: Grünhöfen, Kampichl, Maierhöfen, Pichl, Schlag, Stübegg, Zöbern

 
Districts of Lower Austria